Vasilios Sourlis (born 16 November 2002) is a Greek professional footballer who plays as a midfielder for Olympiacos.

Career 
Sourlis started his football career from Olympiacos FC's academy and he later on became an Olympiacos player in 2019 after signing his first contract with the club. 
He made his debut appearance for the Reds in 15 July 2020, in a game against OFI for the 2019-20 Super League Play-offs, getting subbed on in the place of Maxi Lovera. His next official appearance with the club came in the next season against Panetolikos in a comfortable 3-0 Cup win for Olympiacos. 
In the 2020-21 season, he made an additional 3 appearances for the club against Larissa, Aris and Asteras Tripolis. He won the 2020–21 Super League Greece with Olympiacos. At the start of the 2021-22 season, Sourlis scored his first goal for the club in a friendly against FC Krasnodar, which turned out to be the decisive goal that gave Olympiacos the win.

Career statistics

Club

Honours

Club
Olympiacos
Super League Greece: 2020–21, 2021–22

References

2002 births
Living people
Greece youth international footballers
Greece under-21 international footballers
Association football midfielders
Super League Greece players
Super League Greece 2 players
Eredivisie players
Olympiacos F.C. players
Olympiacos F.C. B players
Fortuna Sittard players
Greek expatriate footballers
Expatriate footballers in the Netherlands
Greek expatriate sportspeople in the Netherlands
Footballers from Athens
Greek footballers